SSCA may refer to:

Organisations
 Safe Schools Coalition Australia, a former national network of organisations working with school communities
 Seven Seas Cruising Association, an international organization for cruisers based in the US
 State Secretariat of Civil Aviation, the civil aviation agency of Cambodia
 Shining Stone Community Action, a Beijing-based organization whose mission is to engage citizens in public decision making
 Springdale School Community Association, of the Springdale School, a building in Springdale, Oregon, US
 Safe Sane Consensual Adults, which merged with the National Leather Association International

Other uses
 Single-strand conformation analysis, see bisulfite sequencing